Keith Andre Wesson Jr. (born August 28, 1997) is an American basketball player. He played college basketball for the Ohio State of the Big Ten Conference. He is the son of former Ohio State player Keith Wesson.

Early life

Wesson was raised in Westerville, Ohio and went to high school at the nearby Westerville South High School.

Recruiting

Wesson committed to Ohio State under head coach Thad Matta on April 13, 2016. After Matta was fired by Ohio State, Wesson stayed committed to Ohio State and new coach Chris Holtmann over offers from Butler (Holtmann's previous team), Xavier, and Akron.

College career
Wesson played in 29 games and averaged 2.3 points and 11.1 minutes per game.

He had his seasonhigh points record against Purdue, scoring 13 points. He averaged 2.9 points and 18.5 minutes per game.

Wesson broke out during his junior season, averaging 8.6 points, 4.1 rebounds, and 30.0 minutes per game while starting 34 out of 35 games. He scored a careerhigh 22 points against Purdue.

His senior season was his best, starting 23 out of 29 games and averaging 9.2 points, 3.9 rebounds, and 30.9 minutes per game. He scored a season high 19 points against Morgan State His college career was cut short due to the COVID-19 pandemic.

Career statistics

College

|-
| style="text-align:left;"| 2016–17
| style="text-align:left;"| Ohio State
| 29 || 0 || 11.2 || .365 || .351 || .536 || 1.2 || .3 || .2 || .2  || 2.3
|-
| style="text-align:left;"| 2017–18
| style="text-align:left;"| Ohio State
| 34 || 5 || 18.5 || .379 || .286 || .750 || 1.8 || 1.1 || .3 || .1  || 2.9
|-
| style="text-align:left;"| 2018–19
| style="text-align:left;"| Ohio State
| 35 || 34 || 30.0 || .430 || .336 || .747 || 4.1 || 1.8 || .6 || .4  || 8.6
|-
| style="text-align:left;"| 2019–20
| style="text-align:left;"| Ohio State
| 29 || 23 || 30.9 || .462 || .422 || .800 || 3.9 || 1.9 || .3 || .4  || 9.2

Personal life
His brother, Kaleb Wesson, also played at Ohio State from 2017 to 2021. He is the son of former Ohio State Basketball player Keith Wesson.

References

External links
Ohio State Buckeyes bio

1997 births
Living people
American men's basketball players
Ohio State Buckeyes men's basketball players
Sportspeople from Ohio